Der Opernball (The Opera Ball) is an operetta in three acts with music by Richard Heuberger, and libretto by Viktor Léon and Heinrich von Waldberg, based on the 1876 comedy  by Alfred Delacour and Alfred Hennequin. Alexander von Zemlinsky assisted Heuberger with the orchestration.  Its premiere was at the Theater an der Wien, Vienna, Austria, on 5 January 1898. The most famous number from the operetta is the waltz duet "". The operetta remains in the repertoire of German-language opera companies, such as the Vienna Volksoper.

Roles
 Theophil Beaubuisson, retiree (bass)
 Palmyra Beaubuisson, his wife (alto)
 Henri, naval cadet, their nephew (tenor or mezzo-soprano)
 Paul Aubier (tenor)
 Angèle, wife of Paul and niece to Madame Beaubuisson (soprano)
 Georges Duménil (tenor, buffo role)
 Marguérite Duménil, wife of Georges (soprano)
 Hortense, chambermaid of the Duménils (soubrette)
 Féodora, a chansonette (soprano)
 Philippe, waiter in the opera entrance hall (tenor)
 Jean, Baptiste, Alfonse, waiters
 Germain, a servant

Synopsis
The setting is Paris during Carnival, towards the end of the 19th century.

Act I

Paul Aubier and his wife Angèle are guests of Georges and Marguérite Duménil.  Marguérite is sceptical of the fidelity of men in marriage, and she persuades Angèle to put their husbands to the test.  On their instructions, the chambermaid Hortense writes two identical letters which invite Paul and Georges to Stelldichein to an opera ball at the Paris Opera, where they will meet a lady with a pink domino as part of her dress. Secretly, Hortense writes a third such letter for Henri, because she wants to appear also with the pink domino.

Act II

The setting is the opera ball, where everyone is masked.  Beaubuisson and the singer Féodara are one couple.  Of the three ladies with the pink domino, Henri sees the pink domino on Hortense, Georges sees it on Angèle, and Paul on Marguérite.  Georges and Paul hope to meet the mysterious lady each in a chambre séparée.  However, Angèle and Marguérite have arranged for a bell signal, at whose sound the lovers are to meet outside the rooms.  In the confusion, Paul and Georges meet each other, and not the expected lady.  Furthermore, they each then see Hortense with the pink domino, not knowing who she is.  Each tries to engage the lady, but in the process, Hortense's pink domino is destroyed.  Marguérite and Angèle are both unaware of the presence of Hortense.

Act III

Back at his residence, Georges discovers the writing paper on which that the invitation to the opera ball was written, and tries to figure out the situation.  Things build to the point where Georges challenges Paul to a duel.  Finally, Marguérite and Angèle show their intact pink dominoes, which nominally proves the fidelity of their husbands.  The role of Hortense in the plot is revealed to all.

Film versions
Three films have been made of Der Opernball.
Opera Ball (dir. Géza von Bolváry, 1939), with Paul Hörbiger, Marte Harell, Hans Moser, Heli Finkenzeller, Theo Lingen, Fita Benkhoff, Will Dohm
Opera Ball (dir. Ernst Marischka, 1956), with Johannes Heesters, Hertha Feiler, Josef Meinrad, Sonja Ziemann, Adrian Hoven, Fita Benkhoff, Theo Lingen (reprising the role of Germain, the servant)
Der Opernball (dir. Eugen York, 1971, for ZDF), with Harald Serafin, Helen Mané, Maurice Besançon, Maria Tiboldi, Uwe Friedrichsen, Christiane Schröder

Recordings

See also 
The Pink Dominos (1877 play)
To-Night's the Night (1914 musical)

References

External links
Libretto, Bosworth, Leipzig 1899

German-language operettas
1898 operas
Operas based on plays
Operas
Operas set in Paris